= Gioi Market =

Giời Markets, or Trời (Sun) Markets, is a flea market in Hanoi, Vietnam. It is the site of the Hoa Binh Fair, and is where a full range of trade goods are sold, from the smallest such as nails and batteries to large items such as motors, electronic goods and refrigeration equipment.

== History ==
According to some sources, the Giời market was established around 1954 or 1955. At that time many people were evacuating to the south of Việt Nam and needed to sell the family goods that they could not take with them. As a number of people had lived here for a long time, it was called "Giời Markets" from the period 1975–1986. When you wanted to buy goods you needed to order them. Traders from state-owned stores also took part, some goods were stolen and displayed on the pavement, a market place without roofs, i.e. Giời market.

== Location ==
The Giời Market still occupies the same location as the original market did. This included Thinh Yen Street and part of Đồng Nhân Street, Tran Cao Van Street, Temple and King Alleys. Goods are auctioned and buyers can watch and wait before bidding for any item.
